Sultan bin Ahmed Al Qasimi is a member of the ruling family of the Emirate of Sharjah in the United Arab Emirates, and the currently appointed Deputy Ruler of Sharjah.

Al Qasimi is a member of the Sharjah Executive Council, President of Sharjah National Oil Company and chairman of Sharjah Media Council.

In December 2021, the ruler of Sharjah appointed Al Qasimi as President of the University of Sharjah.

Personal life 
Al Qasimi is married to Sheikha Bodour bint Sultan bin Muhammad Al Qasimi, the daughter of the ruler of Sharjah and current president of the International Publishers Association.

References 

Sultan bin Ahmed
Living people
Year of birth missing (living people)